Steel Monsters were a toy series from the Tonka company in the 1980s

Produced in 1986 and 1987 by Tonka, they were well-made and colorful 3-3/4" figures, each having its own mini-comic.  Sub-labeled as "The Only Survivors", they were very reminiscent of the Mad Max genre, with Mad Max Beyond Thunderdome coming out the year before. 

1986 line
The Blaster vehicle included Talon (Marauder leader)
The Bomber vehicle included Metal Face (Marauder)
The Destroyer vehicle included Half Track (Survivor)
The Enforcer vehicle included Wheel Boss (Survivor leader)
The Masher vehicle included Metal Face (Marauder)

1987 line
The unproduced Pulverizor vehicle included Tygress (Survivor)
The unproduced Wrecker vehicle included Viking (Survivor)
The unproduced Barbarian vehicle included Retread (Marauder)

Individual carded figures came with a mini-comic book to introduce the character.  They were broken down into good/bad guy teams, the Survivors (the good guys - their vehicles were tan-colored) and the Marauders (the bad guys - their vehicles were black).

References
http://www.toymania.com/334archives/steel/index.htm

Tonka brands
1980s toys
Toy figurines